A list of horror films released in 1970.

References

Sources

 

 
  
  

  
 

  

Lists of horror films by year